The Democratic Party for the Development of Carchuna (in Spanish: Partido Democrático para el Desarollo de Carchuna) is a political party in Carchuna, Motril municipality, Spain.

PDD Carchuna is in coalition with the Independent Group for Municipal Autonomy of Torrenueva.

Political parties in Andalusia